Middle Italy may refer to:
 Central Italy, the central region of Italy
 Middle Italy (political party), a defunct minor centrist political party in Italy